The Brian Piccolo Award is an honor that is given to players of the Chicago Bears. The award is given to one rookie and one veteran per season who best exemplifies the courage, loyalty, teamwork, dedication and sense of humor of the late Brian Piccolo, a running back for the Bears from 1966 until his untimely death from cancer on June 16, 1970, at age 26.

History
Brian Piccolo went un-drafted in the 1965 NFL Draft despite being named the ACC Player of the Year at Wake Forest (1964), where he led the nation with points (111) and yards rushing (1,044) as a senior. In 1965, Piccolo tried out for the Chicago Bears as a free agent and made the team. He progressed from the practice squad to the back-up of starting tailback Gale Sayers by 1967. For the 1969 season, Piccolo was named the starting fullback for the Chicago Bears.

On November 16, during the ninth game of the 1969 season in Atlanta, Piccolo voluntarily removed himself from the game due to extreme difficulty breathing on the field. When the team returned to Chicago, he received a medical examination and chest x-ray that revealed a malignancy. He was then diagnosed with embryonal cell carcinoma, an aggressive form of testicular cancer that had already spread to his chest cavity. After the diagnosis, Piccolo underwent surgery at Sloan-Kettering in New York City to remove the tumor. He had another surgery to remove his left lung and pectoral muscle in April 1970.  Later in June of the same year, Piccolo started to feel chest pain and was re-admitted to the hospital, where doctors determined that the cancer had spread to other organs, most notably his liver. Piccolo died on Tuesday, June 16, 1970, at the age of 26. His courageous battle was later portrayed in the classic 1971 TV movie Brian's Song, starring James Caan as Piccolo.

When Piccolo died in 1970, embryonal cell carcinoma was 100% fatal. With advances in medicine over the years, more than 50% of patients with the disease are now cured.

The Brian Piccolo Award was originally awarded the same year as Piccolo's death (1970) to a Chicago Bears rookie who "best exemplifies the courage, loyalty, teamwork, dedication and sense of humor of the late Brian Piccolo".

In 1990, the Chicago Bears commissioned Chicago native and artist, Tom McKee, to design and sculpt the Brian Piccolo Award that is currently awarded. Each year this bronze sculpture is given to a Bears rookie and a veteran player (since 1992).

Award winners
The Brian Piccolo Award ceremony is held at Halas Hall each year, where Bears center Olin Kreutz and wide receiver Johnny Knox received the 2009 trophy. Previous award winners include Brian Urlacher (2000, 2007), Charles Tillman (2003, 2008, 2013), Tommie Harris (2004), Devin Hester (2006), Greg Olsen (2007), Matt Forte (2008, 2015). Nick Roach and Stephen Paea were the recipients of the Award in 2012, while Tillman, Shea McClellin and Julius Peppers received the Award in 2013. The following year, Jordan Mills and Josh McCown were awarded, but Jay Cutler accepted McCown's award, due to McCown joining the Tampa Bay Buccaneers after the 2013 season.

Brian Piccolo Award winners

References

External links
 Brian Piccolo Award winners
 Brian Piccolo lore

National Football League trophies and awards
Chicago Bears